The 2012–13 Dallas Stars season was the 46th season for the National Hockey League (NHL) franchise that was established on June 5, 1967, and 20th season since the franchise relocated to Dallas to start the 1993–94 season. The regular season was reduced from its usual 82 games to 48 due to the 2012–13 NHL lockout.

During the off-season, the Stars acquired veteran and Pittsburgh Penguins legend Jaromir Jagr after returning to the NHL and playing last season for the Philadelphia Flyers. Due to the lockout, Jagr played only four months as a Star and would be traded to the Boston Bruins, where he would appear in his first Stanley Cup Finals trip since 1992.

The Stars failed to qualify for the Stanley Cup playoffs for the fifth-straight season.

Off-season

Regular season

Standings

Schedule and results

Player statistics
Final 
Skaters

Goaltenders

†Denotes player spent time with another team before joining the Stars.  Stats reflect time with the Stars only.
‡Traded mid-season
Bold/italics denotes franchise record

Transactions 
The Stars have been involved in the following transactions during the 2012–13 season:

Trades

Free agents signed

Free agents lost

Player signings

Draft picks 

Dallas Stars' picks at the 2012 NHL Entry Draft, held in Pittsburgh, Pennsylvania on June 22 & 23, 2012.

Draft notes

 The Washington Capitals' second-round pick (from Colorado via Toronto and Boston) went to the Dallas Stars as a result of a June 22, 2012, trade that sent Mike Ribeiro to the Capitals in exchange for Cody Eakin and this pick.
 The Philadelphia Flyers' second-round pick (from Los Angeles) went to the Dallas Stars as a result of a February 16, 2012, trade that sent Nicklas Grossman to the Flyers in exchange for a 2013 third-round pick and this pick.
 The Florida Panthers' fifth-round pick went to the Dallas Stars as a result of a December 6, 2011, trade that sent Krys Barch and a 2012 sixth round pick to the Panthers in exchange for Jake Hauswirth and this pick.
 The Dallas Stars' sixth-round pick went to the Florida Panthers as the result of a December 6, 2011, trade that sent Jake Hauswirth and 2012 fifth-round pick to the Stars in exchange for Krys Barch and this pick.
 The Los Angeles Kings' seventh-round pick (from Edmonton) went to the Dallas Stars as a result of a June 23, 2012, trade that sent a 2013 seventh-round pick to the Kings in exchange for this pick.
 The Dallas Stars' seventh-round pick went to the Florida Panthers as the result of a June 23, 2012, trade that sent a 2013 seventh-round pick to the Stars in exchange for this pick.

See also 
 2012–13 NHL season

References

Dallas Stars seasons
D
D
Dallas Stars
Dallas Stars
2010s in Dallas
2012 in Texas
2013 in Texas